Marlène Canguio (10 March 1942) is a former French athlete specialising in the hurdles.

Biography  
Marlene Canguio won five champion of France titles: the 80 metres hurdles in 1963 and 1964, the long jump in 1967, and 100 meters hurdles in 1969.

She is the first holder of the  French record in the 100 meter hurdles (13.6 in 1969) and she also improved five times the record for the 4 × 100 Metres Relay (in 1964, 1967 and 1968).

She participated in the 1964 Olympic Games in Tokyo. Eliminated in the preliminary heats  of the 80 meter hurdles, she took eighth place in the 4 × 100 m relay. Selected for the games in Mexico in 1968 in several disciplines, an injury deprived her of a second Olympics.[ref.   necessary]

Prize list  
 French Championships in Athletics   :  
 winner of the 80m hurdles in 1963 and 1964.   
 winner of 100 m hurdles 1969.   
 winner of the long jump 1967.

Records

References  

Marlène Canguio sports-reference.com

1942 births
Living people
People from Sainte-Rose, Guadeloupe
Guadeloupean female hurdlers
Guadeloupean female sprinters
Guadeloupean long jumpers
French female sprinters
French female hurdlers
French female long jumpers
Olympic athletes of France
French people of Guadeloupean descent
Athletes (track and field) at the 1964 Summer Olympics